Serémange-Erzange (Lorraine Franconian Schreméngen-Ierséngen) is a commune in the Moselle department in Grand Est in north-eastern France. The commune is composed of the localities Serémange, Erzange and Suzange.

See also
 Communes of the Moselle department

References

External links
 

Seremangeerzange